The 434th Bombardment Squadron is an inactive United States Air Force unit.  It was last assigned to the 12th Bombardment Group, stationed at Fort Lawton, Washington.  It was inactivated on 22 January 1946.

History
The 434th was established as a Northwest Air District Reconnaissance squadron at McChord Field in 1941.  After the Japanese attack on Pearl Harbor, it flew antisubmarine and defensive patrols over the Pacific Northwest coast until February 1942, when it was reassigned to Louisiana, flying antisubmarine patrols over the Gulf of Mexico.

The squadron was re-equipped with modern B-25 Mitchell medium bombers in California during April 1942, after which it deployed to Egypt to support British forces in the Western Desert Campaign and was assigned to IX Bomber Command.  The squadron's ground personnel were transported by ship around the Cape of Good Hope to India, then on to Cairo.  In the meantime, its aircraft were flown via the transcontinental route to Morrison Field, Florida, where they were fitted with long range auxiliary fuel ranks before departing via the South Atlantic route to South America, crossing the Atlantic to Liberia, and then flying north across central Africa to Cairo by way of Khartoum.

From August 1942 to June 1943, the 434th supported the British Eighth Army as they advanced into Tunisia and later participated in the invasion of Sicily and Italy. The squadron remained in the Mediterranean Theater of Operations until February 1944.

In March 1944, the squadron was reassigned to reinforce Tenth Air Force in the China Burma India Theater and was relocated across the Middle East to India.  It provided tactical bombardment support to British forces in Burma until the Japanese capitulation in August 1945.  The 434th was demobilized in India during the fall of 1945, with its aircraft sent to reclamation or reassigned to friendly foreign air forces, and was finally inactivated as a paper unit in late January 1946.

Lineage
 Constituted 19th Reconnaissance Squadron (Light) on 20 November 1940
 Activated on 15 January 1941
 Redesignated: 94th Bombardment Squadron (Light) on 14 August 1941
 Redesignated: 94th Reconnaissance Squadron (Medium) on 30 December 1941
 Redesignated: 434th Bombardment Squadron (Medium) on 22 April 1942
 Inactivated on 22 January 1946.

Assignments
 12th Bombardment Group: attached 15 January 1941; assigned 14 August 1941 – 22 January 1946.
 Associated with: 1st Photographic Group, 10 Jun 1941-22 Apr 1942 (training)

Stations

 McChord Field, Washington, 15 January 1941
 Esler Army Airfield, Louisiana, 27 February-3 July 1942
 Operated from Stockton Army Airfield, California, 24 May-24 June 1942
 Ismailia Airfield, Egypt, 14 August 1942
 Landing Ground 88, Egypt, 29 September 1942
 RAF Gambut, Libya, 5 December 1942
 Magrun Landing Ground, Libya, 14 December 1942
 RAF Gambut, Libya, 17 December 1942
 RAF Castel Benito, Libya, 16 February 1943
 El Assa Airfield, Libya, 8 March 1943
 Medenine Airfield, Tunisia, 3 April 1943
 Sfax Airfield, Tunisia, 17 April 1943
 Hergla Airfield, Tunisia, 2 June 1943

 Ponte Olivo Airfield, Sicily, 2 August 1943
 Gerbini Airfield, Sicily, 22 August 1943
 Foggia Airfield, Italy, 2 November 1943
 Gaudo Airfield, Italy, 18 January-6 February 1944
 Kurmitola Airfield, India, 21 March 1944
 Madhaiganj Airfield, India, 13 June 1944
 Comilla Airfield, India, 21 July 1944
 Fenny Airfield, India,  27 November 1944
 Operated from Magwe Airfield, Burma, 5–24 May 1945
 Karachi Airport, India, 17 September 1945
 Karachi Airport, India, 22 November-24 December 1945
 Fort Lawton, Washington, 21–22 January 1946

Aircraft
 B-18 Bolo, 1941–1942
 B-23 Dragon, 1941–1942
 B-25 Mitchell, 1942–1945
 A-26 Invader, 1945

References

Military units and formations in Washington (state)
Bombardment squadrons of the United States Army Air Forces